The Minyon Falls Rhyolite Member is a geologic formation in the far north east of New South Wales, Australia. This formation is up to 500 metres thick. Formed from a volcanic lava flow some 20 million years ago in the Cenozoic, it is part of the Nimbin Rhyolite group of the Lamington Volcanics. Constituents include porphyritic and non porphyritic rhyolite, obsidian, pitchstone, tuff, and agglomerate. It may be viewed at Minyon Falls.

See also 
Tweed Volcano

References 

Geologic formations of Australia
Cenozoic Australia
Geology of New South Wales